Pioneer Hall is an historic building in the Madison Park neighborhood of Seattle, in the U.S. state of Washington. The building is listed on the National Register of Historic Places.

See also

 National Register of Historic Places listings in Seattle

References

External links
 

Buildings and structures in Seattle
National Register of Historic Places in Seattle